Anna Santer (born April 18, 1975) was an Italian cross-country skier who competed in the 1990s and 2000s.

Santer was born in Pieve di Cadore. She is married and lives in Cortina d'Ampezzo.

Cross-country skiing results
All results are sourced from the International Ski Federation (FIS).

World Cup

Season standings

References

External links
 

Italian female cross-country skiers
1975 births
Living people
Sportspeople from the Province of Belluno